Premonición Live is a live album of Spanish pop singer David Bisbal released in 2007. This is the second live album of the singer, the first being Todo Por Ustedes.

Track listing
It was released in 3CDs:

CD1
All renditions on CD1 are live
Intro Show 2007 / Calentando Voy – 5:12
Medley Funk – 5:07
Amar Es Lo Que Quiero – 4:32
Premonición – 4:18
Qué Tendrás – 4:04
Oye El Boom – 5:04
Cuidar Nuestro Amor (I'll Never Let Go) – 4:03
Esta Ausencia – 5:02
Lloraré Las Penas – 4:54
Ave María –   5:46
Amanecer Sin Ti – 4:01

CD2
All renditions on CD1 are live
Medley Baladas 1 – 4:56
Aquí Y Ahora – 4:38
Como La Primera Vez – 4:01
Medley Baladas 2 – 4:31
Como Olvidar – 5:19
Dígale – 9:17
Quien Me Iba A Decir – 3:38
Silencio – 6:29
Soldado De Papel – 7:01
Torre De Babel – 3:33
Bulería – 5:58

CD3
(Studio recordings)
Todo Por Ustedes (versión estudio-demo) – 4:30
La Actriz – 3:10
Crumbling – 4:10
No Juegues Conmigo – 4:39
Odio Y Placer (demo) – 3:27
Amante Bandido – 4:09
Bum Bum Bum – 4:27
Cuidar Nuestro Amor (I'll Never Let Go) (demo up-tempo) – 3:36
Profundo (Crumbling) – 4:09
Caramelito – 3:06
Hear The Boom – 4:25
The Sun Ain't Gonna Shine Anymore (Sun Rivera Spanglish mix) – 6:33
Desnúdate Mujer (JMV Dance remix) – 4:51
Hate That I Love You (Spanglish version) – 3:41

References

David Bisbal live albums
2007 live albums
Spanish-language live albums
Universal Music Latino live albums